Valeri Mikhailovich Lebedev (born 13 June 1969 in Magadan) is a former Russian football player.

Honours
Olimpia Bălți
Moldovan National Division bronze: 1994–95

Zimbru Chișinău
Moldovan National Division champion: 1995–96, 1997–98
Moldovan National Division runner-up: 1996–97
Moldovan Cup winner: 1996–97, 1997–98

References

1969 births
People from Magadan
Living people
Soviet footballers
FC Luch Vladivostok players
Russian footballers
Russian Premier League players
Moldovan Super Liga players
CSF Bălți players
Russian expatriate footballers
Expatriate footballers in Moldova
FC Zimbru Chișinău players
FC Khimki players
Association football defenders
Sportspeople from Magadan Oblast